Naengcheon Nature Land is a park that is located in Daegu Dalseong-gun, South Korea.

In March 1976 it was created and named 'Naengcheon Nature Won', then changed its name to 'Naengcheon Nature Land' in March 1993.

In June 2005 it was renamed again to Herb Hillz (허브힐즈).

Description
Herb Hillz is a herb-and flower-packed park which also hosts a variety of events and attractions, which change with the seasons. The park covers some 10,000 m², and includes a large stand of metasequoia trees. It contains the only green tea field in the Yeongnam area - the “Kim Taehee Green Tea Garden.”

Rides and attractions include bumper cars, a swinging ship, a family-oriented zoo, and quaint shops. It offers sledding in the winter, flowering herbs in the spring, and water activities in the warm season, as well as year-round craft activities. An Eco-adventure area includes a climbing wall and ziplines.

References

 100.naver.com (Korean only)

Parks in Daegu
Dalseong County